The Tour de Centuri is a ruined Genoese tower located in Corsica in the commune of Centuri, on the west coast of Cap Corse.  Only the base of the tower survives.

The tower was one of a series of coastal defences constructed by the Republic of Genoa between 1530 and 1620 to stem the attacks by Barbary pirates.

References

Towers in Corsica